Pennsylvania House of Representatives District 11 is a legislative district located in western Pennsylvania.

District profile
The 11th Pennsylvania House of Representatives District is located in Butler County and includes the following areas: 

Buffalo Township
Butler
Butler Township
Chicora
Clearfield Township
Clinton Towsnhip
Donegal Township
East Butler
Jefferson Township
Oakland Township
Saxonburg
Summit Township
Winfield Township

Recent election results

References

External links
https://www2.census.gov/geo/maps/dc10map/SLD_RefMap/lower/st42_pa/sldl42011/DC10SLDL42011_001.pdf
Pennsylvania House Legislative District Maps from the Pennsylvania Redistricting Commission.  
Population Data for District 11 from the Pennsylvania Redistricting Commission.

Government of Butler County, Pennsylvania
11